David Cairns may refer to:
Sir David Arnold Scott Cairns (1902–1987), Lord Justice of Appeal
David Cairns (politician) (1966–2011), British politician
David Cairns (rugby league) (born 1959), rugby league footballer
David Cairns (writer) (born 1926), music critic and writer
David Cairns, 5th Earl Cairns (1909–1989), Marshal of the Diplomatic Corps in the Royal Household
David Cairns (musician) (born 1958), songwriter
Davie Cairns (born 1951), Scottish footballer

See also
Cairns (disambiguation)